Cream of the Crap! Vol. 1 is the first of two compilation albums by Swedish rock band The Hellacopters which contains rare singles, B-sides, EP selections, and other non-album tracks by the band.  The follow-up Cream of the Crap! Vol. 2 was released two years later.

Track listing
 "Thanks for Nothing" (Nicke Andersson) - 2:45
 B-side of the single "Down Right Blue"
 "Crimson Ballroom" (Andersson) - 4:05
 Released with punk/car magazine Gearhead Magazine #10
 "Makes It Alright" (Andersson) - 2:18
 Released with "Move Right Out of Here" 7' and 10' vinyl single
 "Television Addict" (The Victims) - 3:00
 The Victims cover, B-side of the single "Riot on the Rocks"
 "Killing Allan" (The Hellacopters) - 3:48
 Previously a limited edition single
 "Misanthropic High" (The Hellacopters) - 3:14
 Previously a limited edition single in three different colors
 "Rock Hammer" (The Hellacopters) - 4:16
 B-side of the single "Looking at Me"
 "1995" (The Hellacopters) - 3:23
 Previously a limited edition single in different colors
 "Gimme Shelter" (Mick Jagger, Keith Richards) - 4:21
 The Rolling Stones cover, B-side of the single "Like No Other Man"
 "Heart of the Matter" (Andersson, Kenny Håkansson) - 3:23
 Released with "Move Right Out of Here" 7' and 10' vinyl single
 "Tilt City" (The Hellacopters) - 1:51
 B-side of the single "1995"
 "Down Right Blue" (Andersson) - 4:33
 Previously a limited edition vinyl single
 "I Got a Right" (Iggy Pop, James Williamson) - 3:50
 The Stooges cover, B-side of the single "Misanthropic High"
 "Ferrytale" (The Hellacopters) - 3:33
 From the EP Disappointment Blues
 "Freespeedin" (The Hellacopters) - 2:59
 B-side of the single "1995"
 "I Want a Lip" (Tempio) - 2:54
 April Stevens cover, previously a limited edition single in four different colors
 "The Creeps" (Mike Ness) - 2:14
 Social Distortion cover, B-side of the single "Killing Allan"
 "Lowered Pentangles (Anything at All)" (Andersson) - 3:22
 From the New Bomb Turks/The Hellacopters split single

2002 compilation albums
The Hellacopters albums